Sir Muhammad Iqbal (9 November 187721 April 1938) was a South Asian Muslim writer, philosopher, scholar and politician, whose poetry in the Urdu language is considered among the greatest of the twentieth century, and whose vision of a cultural and political ideal for the Muslims of British-ruled India was to animate the impulse for Pakistan. He is commonly referred to by the honorific Allama (from ).

Born and raised in Sialkot, Punjab in an ethnic Kashmiri Muslim family, Iqbal completed his B.A. and M.A. at the Government College Lahore.  He taught Arabic at the Oriental College, Lahore from 1899 until 1903. During this time, he wrote prolifically.  Among the Urdu poems from this time that remain popular are Parinde ki faryad (A bird's prayer), an early meditation on animal rights, and Tarana-e-Hindi (The Song of Hindustan) a patriotic poem—both poems composed for children. In 1905, he left for further studies in Europe, first to England, where he completed a second B.A. at Trinity College, Cambridge and was subsequently called to the bar at Lincoln's Inn, and then to Germany, where he received a Ph.D. in philosophy at the University of Munich.  After returning to Lahore in 1908, he established a law practice but concentrated on writing scholarly works on politics, economics, history, philosophy, and religion. He is best known for his poetic works, including Asrar-e-Khudi – after whose publication he was awarded a knighthood, Rumuz-e-Bekhudi, and the Bang-e-Dara. In Iran, where he is known as Iqbāl-e Lāhorī (Iqbal of Lahore), he is highly regarded for his Persian works.

Iqbal regarded Rumi as his Guide and Ashraf Ali Thanwi as the greatest living authority on the matter of Rumi's teachings. He was a strong proponent of the political and spiritual revival of Islamic civilisation across the world, but in particular in South Asia; a series of lectures he delivered to this effect were published as The Reconstruction of Religious Thought in Islam. Iqbal was elected to the Punjab Legislative Council in 1927 and held a number of positions in the All India Muslim League. In his 1930 presidential address at the League's annual meeting in Allahabad, he formulated a political framework for Muslims in British-ruled India. Iqbal died in 1938.  After the creation of Pakistan in 1947, he was named the national poet there. He is also known as the "Hakeem-ul-Ummat" (“The Sage of the Ummah”) and the "Mufakkir-e-Pakistan" (“The Thinker of Pakistan”). The anniversary of his birth (Yom-e Welādat-e Muḥammad Iqbāl), 9 November, used to be a public holiday in Pakistan until 2018. Abul Hasan Ali Hasani Nadwi wrote Glory of Iqbal to introduce him to the Arab world.

Personal life

Background 

Iqbal was born on 9 November 1877 in an ethnic Kashmiri family in Sialkot within the Punjab Province of British India (now in Pakistan). His family was Kashmiri Pandit (of the Sapru clan) that converted to Islam in the 15th century and which traced its roots back to a south Kashmir village in Kulgam. In the 19th century, when the Sikh Empire was conquering Kashmir, his grandfather's family migrated to Punjab. Iqbal's grandfather was an eighth cousin of Sir Tej Bahadur Sapru, an important lawyer and freedom fighter who would eventually become an admirer of Iqbal. Iqbal often mentioned and commemorated his Kashmiri lineage in his writings. According to scholar Annemarie Schimmel, Iqbal often wrote about his being "a son of Kashmiri-Brahmans but (being) acquainted with the wisdom of Rumi and Tabriz."

Iqbal's father, Sheikh Noor Muhammad (died 1930), was a tailor, not formally educated, but a religious man. Iqbal's mother Imam Bibi, a Kashmiri from Sambrial, was described as a polite and humble woman who helped the poor and her neighbours with their problems. She died on 9 November 1914 in Sialkot. Iqbal loved his mother, and on her death he expressed his feelings of pathos in an elegy:

Early education 
Iqbal was four years old when he was sent to a mosque to receive instruction in reading the Qur'an. He learned the Arabic language from his teacher, Syed Mir Hassan, the head of the madrasa and professor of Arabic at Scotch Mission College in Sialkot, where he matriculated in 1893. He received an Intermediate level with the Faculty of Arts diploma in 1895. The same year he enrolled at Government College University, where he obtained his Bachelor of Arts in philosophy, English literature and Arabic in 1897, and won the Khan Bahadurddin F.S. Jalaluddin medal as he performed well in Arabic. In 1899, he received his Master of Arts degree from the same college and won first place in philosophy in the University of the Punjab.

Marriages 

Iqbal married three times under different circumstances.
 His first marriage was in 1895 when he was 18 years old. His bride, Karim Bibi, was the daughter of a Gujrati physician, Khan Bahadur Ata Muhammad Khan. Her sister was the mother of director and music composer Khwaja Khurshid Anwar. Their families arranged the marriage, and the couple had two children; a daughter, Miraj Begum (1895–1915), and a son, Aftab Iqbal (1899–1979), who became a barrister. Another son is said to have died after birth in 1901.
Iqbal and Karim Bibi separated somewhere between 1910 and 1913. Despite this, he continued to financially support her till his death.

 Iqbal's second marriage was with Mukhtar Begum, and it was held in December 1914, shortly after the death of Iqbal's mother the previous November. They had a son, but both the mother and son died shortly after birth in 1924.
 Later, Iqbal married Sardar Begum, and they became the parents of a son, Javed Iqbal (1924–2015), who became Senior Justice of the Supreme Court of Pakistan, and a daughter, Muneera Bano (born 1930). One of Muneera's sons is the philanthropist-cum-socialite Yousuf Salahuddin.

Higher education in Europe 
Iqbal was influenced by the teachings of Sir Thomas Arnold, his philosophy teacher at Government College Lahore, to pursue higher education in the West. In 1905, he travelled to England for that purpose. While already acquainted with Friedrich Nietzsche and Henri Bergson, Iqbal would discover Rumi slightly before his departure to England, and he would teach the Masnavi to his friend Swami Rama Tirtha, who in return would teach him Sanskrit. Iqbal qualified for a scholarship from Trinity College, University of Cambridge, and obtained a Bachelor of Arts in 1906. This  B.A. degree in London, made him eligible, to practice as an advocate, as it was being practiced those days. In the same year he was called to the bar as a barrister at Lincoln's Inn. In 1907, Iqbal moved to Germany to pursue his doctoral studies, and earned a Doctor of Philosophy degree from the Ludwig Maximilian University of Munich in 1908. Working under the guidance of Friedrich Hommel, Iqbal's doctoral thesis was entitled The Development of Metaphysics in Persia. Among his fellow students in Munich was Hans-Hasso von Veltheim who later happened to visit Iqbal the day before Iqbal died.

In 1907, he had a close friendship with the writer Atiya Fyzee in both Britain and Germany. Atiya would later publish their correspondence. While Iqbal was in Heidelberg in 1907, his German professor Emma Wegenast taught him about Goethe's Faust, Heine and Nietzsche. He mastered German in three months. A street in Heidelberg has been named in his memory, "Iqbal Ufer". During his study in Europe, Iqbal began to write poetry in Persian. He preferred to write in this language because doing so made it easier to express his thoughts. He would write continuously in Persian throughout his life.

Academic career 

Iqbal began his career as a reader of Arabic after completing his Master of Arts degree in 1899, at Oriental College and shortly afterward was selected as a junior professor of philosophy at Government College Lahore, where he had also been a student in the past. He worked there until he left for England in 1905. In 1907 he went to Germany for PhD In 1908, he returned from Germany and joined the same college again as a professor of philosophy and English literature. In the same period Iqbal began practising law at the Chief Court of Lahore, but he soon quit law practice and devoted himself to literary works, becoming an active member of Anjuman-e-Himayat-e-Islam. In 1919, he became the general secretary of the same organisation. Iqbal's thoughts in his work primarily focus on the spiritual direction and development of human society, centered around experiences from his travels and stays in Western Europe and the Middle East. He was profoundly influenced by Western philosophers such as Nietzsche, Bergson, and Goethe. He also closely worked with Ibrahim Hisham during his stay at the Aligarh Muslim University.

The poetry and philosophy of Rumi strongly influenced Iqbal. Deeply grounded in religion since childhood, Iqbal began concentrating intensely on the study of Islam, the culture and history of Islamic civilisation and its political future, while embracing Rumi as "his guide". Iqbal's works focus on reminding his readers of the past glories of Islamic civilisation and delivering the message of a pure, spiritual focus on Islam as a source for socio-political liberation and greatness. Iqbal denounced political divisions within and amongst Muslim nations, and frequently alluded to and spoke in terms of the global Muslim community or the Ummah.

Iqbal's poetry was translated into many European languages in the early part of the 20th century. Iqbal's Asrar-i-Khudi and Javed Nama were translated into English by R. A. Nicholson and A. J. Arberry, respectively.

Legal career 

Iqbal was not only a prolific writer but also a known advocate. He appeared before the Lahore High Court in both civil and criminal matters. There are more than 100 reported judgments to his name.

Final years and death 

In 1933, after returning from a trip to Spain and Afghanistan, Iqbal suffered from a mysterious throat illness. He spent his final years helping Chaudhry Niaz Ali Khan to establish the Dar ul Islam Trust Institute at a Jamalpur estate near Pathankot, where there were plans to subsidise studies in classical Islam and contemporary social science. He also advocated for an independent Muslim state. Iqbal ceased practising law in 1934 and was granted a pension by the Nawab of Bhopal. In his final years, he frequently visited the Dargah of famous Sufi Ali Hujwiri in Lahore for spiritual guidance. After suffering for months from his illness, Iqbal died in Lahore on 21 April 1938. It is maintained that he breathed his last listening to a kafi of Bulleh Shah. His tomb is located in Hazuri Bagh, the enclosed garden between the entrance of the Badshahi Mosque and the Lahore Fort, and official guards are provided by the Government of Pakistan.

Efforts and influences

Political 

Iqbal first became interested in national affairs in his youth. He received considerable recognition from the Punjabi elite after his return from England in 1908, and he was closely associated with Mian Muhammad Shafi. When the All-India Muslim League was expanded to the provincial level, and Shafi received a significant role in the structural organisation of the Punjab Muslim League, Iqbal was made one of the first three joint secretaries along with Shaikh Abdul Aziz and Maulvi Mahbub Alam. While dividing his time between law practice and poetry, Iqbal remained active in the Muslim League. He did not support Indian involvement in World War I and stayed in close touch with Muslim political leaders such as Mohammad Ali Jouhar and Muhammad Ali Jinnah. He was a critic of the mainstream Indian National Congress, which he regarded as dominated by Hindus, and was disappointed with the League when, during the 1920s, it was absorbed in factional divides between the pro-British group led by Shafi and the centrist group led by Jinnah. He was active in the Khilafat Movement, and was among the founding fathers of Jamia Millia Islamia which was established at Aligarh in October 1920. He was also given the offer of being the first vice-chancellor of Jamia Millia Islamia by Mahatma Gandhi, which he refused.

In November 1926, with the encouragement of friends and supporters, Iqbal contested the election for a seat in the Punjab Legislative Assembly from the Muslim district of Lahore, and defeated his opponent by a margin of 3,177 votes. He supported the constitutional proposals presented by Jinnah to guarantee Muslim political rights and influence in a coalition with the Congress and worked with Aga Khan and other Muslim leaders to mend the factional divisions and achieve unity in the Muslim League. While in Lahore he was a friend of Abdul Sattar Ranjoor.

Iqbal, Jinnah and the concept of Pakistan 
Ideologically separated from Congress Muslim leaders, Iqbal had also been disillusioned with the politicians of the Muslim League, owing to the factional conflict that plagued the League in the 1920s. Discontent with factional leaders like Shafi and Fazl-ur-Rahman, Iqbal came to believe that only Jinnah was a political leader capable of preserving unity and fulfilling the League's objectives of Muslim political empowerment. Building a strong, personal correspondence with Jinnah, Iqbal was influential in convincing Jinnah to end his self-imposed exile in London, return to India and take charge of the League. Iqbal firmly believed that Jinnah was the only leader capable of drawing Indian Muslims to the League and maintaining party unity before the British and the Congress:

While Iqbal espoused the idea of Muslim-majority provinces in 1930, Jinnah would continue to hold talks with the Congress through the decade and only officially embraced the goal of Pakistan in 1940. Some historians postulate that Jinnah always remained hopeful for an agreement with the Congress and never fully desired the partition of India. Iqbal's close correspondence with Jinnah is speculated by some historians as having been responsible for Jinnah's embrace of the idea of Pakistan. Iqbal elucidated to Jinnah his vision of a separate Muslim state in a letter sent on 21 June 1937:

Iqbal, serving as president of the Punjab Muslim League, criticised Jinnah's political actions, including a political agreement with Punjabi leader Sikandar Hyat Khan, whom Iqbal saw as a representative of feudal classes and not committed to Islam as the core political philosophy. Nevertheless, Iqbal worked constantly to encourage Muslim leaders and masses to support Jinnah and the League. Speaking about the political future of Muslims in India, Iqbal said:

Madani–Iqbal debate 

A famous debate was held between Iqbal and Hussain Ahmed Madani on the question of nationalism in the late 1930s. Madani’s position throughout was to insist on the Islamic legitimacy of embracing a culturally plural, secular democracy as the best and the only realistic future for India’s Muslims where Iqbal insisted on a religiously defined, homogeneous Muslim society. Madani and Iqbal both appreciated this point and they never advocated the creation of an absolute ‘Islamic State’. They differed only in their first step. According to Madani the first step was the freedom of India for which composite nationalism was necessary. According to Iqbal the first step was the creation of a community of Muslims in the Muslim majority land, i.e. a Muslim India within India.

Revival of Islamic policy 

Iqbal's six English lectures were published in Lahore in 1930, and then by the Oxford University Press in 1934 in the book The Reconstruction of Religious Thought in Islam. The lectures had been delivered at Madras, Hyderabad and Aligarh. These lectures dwell on the role of Islam as a religion and as a political and legal philosophy in the modern age. In these lectures Iqbal firmly rejects the political attitudes and conduct of Muslim politicians, whom he saw as morally misguided, attached to power and without any standing with the Muslim masses.

Iqbal expressed fears that not only would secularism weaken the spiritual foundations of Islam and Muslim society but that India's Hindu-majority population would crowd out Muslim heritage, culture, and political influence. In his travels to Egypt, Afghanistan, Iran, and Turkey, he promoted ideas of greater Islamic political co-operation and unity, calling for the shedding of nationalist differences. He also speculated on different political arrangements to guarantee Muslim political power; in a dialogue with Dr. B. R. Ambedkar, Iqbal expressed his desire to see Indian provinces as autonomous units under the direct control of the British government and with no central Indian government. He envisaged autonomous Muslim regions in India. Under a single Indian union, he feared for Muslims, who would suffer in many respects, especially concerning their existentially separate entity as Muslims.

Iqbal was elected president of the Muslim League in 1930 at its session in Allahabad in the United Provinces, as well as for the session in Lahore in 1932. In his presidential address on 29 December 1930 he outlined a vision of an independent state for Muslim-majority provinces in north-western India:

In his speech, Iqbal emphasised that, unlike Christianity, Islam came with "legal concepts" with "civic significance", with its "religious ideals" considered as inseparable from social order: "Therefore, if it means a displacement of the Islamic principle of solidarity, the construction of a policy on national lines, is simply unthinkable to a Muslim." Iqbal thus stressed not only the need for the political unity of Muslim communities but the undesirability of blending the Muslim population into a wider society not based on Islamic principles.

He thus became the first politician to articulate what would become known as the Two-nation theory—that Muslims are a distinct nation and thus deserve political independence from other regions and communities of India. Even as he rejected secularism and nationalism he would not elucidate or specify if his ideal Islamic state would be a theocracy, and criticised the "intellectual attitudes" of Islamic scholars (ulema) as having "reduced the Law of Islam practically to the state of immobility".

The latter part of Iqbal's life was concentrated on political activity. He travelled across Europe and West Asia to garner political and financial support for the League. He reiterated the ideas of his 1932 address, and, during the third Round Table Conference, he opposed the Congress and proposals for transfer of power without considerable autonomy or independence for Muslim provinces.

He would serve as president of the Punjab Muslim League, and would deliver speeches and publish articles in an attempt to rally Muslims across India as a single political entity. Iqbal consistently criticised feudal classes in Punjab as well as Muslim politicians opposed to the League. Many accounts of Iqbal's frustration toward Congress leadership were also pivotal in providing a vision for the two-nation theory.

Patron of Tolu-e-Islam 

Iqbal was the first patron of Tolu-e-Islam, a historical, political, religious and cultural journal of the Muslims of British India. For a long time, Iqbal wanted a journal to propagate his ideas and the aims and objectives of the All India Muslim League. In 1935, according to his instructions, Syed Nazeer Niazi initiated and edited the journal, named after Iqbal's poem  "Tulu'i Islam". Niazi dedicated the first issue of the journal to Iqbal. The journal would play an important role in the Pakistan movement. Later, the journal was continued by Ghulam Ahmed Pervez, who had contributed many articles in its early editions.

Literary work

Persian 
Iqbal's poetic works are written primarily in Persian rather than Urdu. Among his 12,000 verses of poetry, about 7,000 verses are in Persian. In 1915, he published his first collection of poetry, the Asrar-i-Khudi  (Secrets of the Self) in Persian. The poems emphasize the spirit and self from a religious perspective. Many critics have called this Iqbal's finest poetic work. In Asrar-i-Khudi, Iqbal explains his philosophy of "Khudi", or "Self". Iqbal's use of the term "Khudi" is synonymous with the word "Rooh" used in the Quran for a divine spark which is present in every human being, and was said by Iqbal to be present in Adam, for which God ordered all of the angels to prostrate in front of Adam. Iqbal condemns self-destruction. For him, the aim of life is self-realization and self-knowledge. He charts the stages through which the "Self" has to pass before finally arriving at its point of perfection, enabling the knower of the "Self" to become a vice-regent of God.

In his Rumuz-i-Bekhudi  (Hints of Selflessness), Iqbal seeks to prove the Islamic way of life is the best code of conduct for a nation's viability. A person must keep his characteristics intact, he asserts, but once this is achieved, he should sacrifice his ambitions for the needs of the nation. Man cannot realise the "Self" outside of society. Published in 1917, this group of poems has as its main themes the ideal community, Islamic ethical and social principles, and the relationship between the individual and society. Although he supports Islam, Iqbal also recognizes the positive aspects of other religions. Rumuz-i-Bekhudi complements the emphasis on the self in Asrar-e-Khudi and the two collections are often put in the same volume under the title Asrar-i-Rumuz (Hinting Secrets). It is addressed to the world's Muslims.

Iqbal's 1924 publication, the Payam-e-Mashriq  (The Message of the East), is closely connected to the West-östlicher Diwan by the German poet Goethe. Goethe bemoans the West having become too materialistic in outlook, and expects the East will provide a message of hope to resuscitate spiritual values. Iqbal styles his work as a reminder to the West of the importance of morality, religion, and civilisation by underlining the need for cultivating feeling, ardor, and dynamism. He asserts that an individual can never aspire to higher dimensions unless he learns of the nature of spirituality. In his first visit to Afghanistan, he presented Payam-e Mashreq to King Amanullah Khan. In it, he admired the uprising of Afghanistan against the British Empire. In 1933, he was officially invited to Afghanistan to join the meetings regarding the establishment of Kabul University.

The Zabur-e-Ajam  (Persian Psalms), published in 1927, includes the poems "Gulshan-e-Raz-e-Jadeed" ("Garden of New Secrets") and "Bandagi Nama" ("Book of Slavery"). In "Gulshan-e-Raz-e-Jadeed", Iqbal first poses questions, then answers them with the help of ancient and modern insight. "Bandagi Nama" denounces slavery and attempts to explain the spirit behind the fine arts of enslaved societies. Here, as in other books, Iqbal insists on remembering the past, doing well in the present and preparing for the future, while emphasizing love, enthusiasm and energy to fulfill the ideal life.

Iqbal's 1932 work, the Javed Nama  (Book of Javed), is named after and in a manner addressed to his son, who is featured in the poems. It follows the examples of the works of Ibn Arabi and Dante's The Divine Comedy, through mystical and exaggerated depictions across time. Iqbal depicts himself as Zinda Rud ("A stream full of life") guided by Rumi, "the master", through various heavens and spheres and has the honour of approaching divinity and coming in contact with divine illuminations. In a passage reliving a historical period, Iqbal condemns the Muslims who were instrumental in the defeat and death of Nawab Siraj-ud-Daula of Bengal and Tipu Sultan of Mysore by betraying them for the benefit of the British colonists, and thus delivering their country to the shackles of slavery. In the end, by addressing his son Javed, he speaks to the young people at large, and guides the "new generation".

Pas Chih Bayed Kard Ay Aqwam-e-Sharq  includes the poem "Musafir"  ("The Traveller"). Again, Iqbal depicts Rumi as a character and gives an exposition of the mysteries of Islamic laws and Sufi perceptions. Iqbal laments the dissension and disunity among the Indian Muslims as well as Muslim nations. "Musafir" is an account of one of Iqbal's journeys to Afghanistan, in which the Pashtun people are counselled to learn the "secret of Islam" and to "build up the self" within themselves.

His love of the Persian language is evident in his works and poetry. He says in one of his poems:

Translation: Even though in sweetness Hindi* [archaic name for Urdu, lit. "language of India"] is sugar – (but) speech method in Dari [the variety of Persian in Afghanistan ] is sweeter *

Throughout his life, Iqbal would prefer writing in Persian as he believed it allowed him to fully express philosophical concepts, and it gave him a wider audience.

Urdu 

Muhammad Iqbal's The Call of the Marching Bell (bang-e-dara), his first collection of Urdu poetry, was published in 1924. It was written in three distinct phases of his life. The poems he wrote up to 1905—the year he left for England—reflect patriotism and the imagery of nature, including the Urdu language patriotic "Saare Jahan se Accha", and "Tarana-e-Milli" ("The Song of the Community"). The second set of poems date from 1905 to 1908, when Iqbal studied in Europe, and dwell upon the nature of European society, which he emphasised had lost spiritual and religious values. This inspired Iqbal to write poems on the historical and cultural heritage of Islam and the Muslim community, with a global perspective. Iqbal urges the entire Muslim community, addressed as the Ummah, to define personal, social and political existence by the values and teachings of Islam.

Iqbal's works were in Persian for most of his career, but after 1930 his works were mainly in Urdu. His works in this period were often specifically directed at the Muslim masses of India, with an even stronger emphasis on Islam and Muslim spiritual and political reawakening. Published in 1935, Bal-e-Jibril  (Wings of Gabriel) is considered by many critics as his finest Urdu poetry and was inspired by his visit to Spain, where he visited the monuments and legacy of the kingdom of the Moors. It consists of ghazals, poems, quatrains and epigrams and carries a strong sense of religious passion.

Zarb-i-Kalim   (or The Rod of Moses) is another philosophical poetry book of Allama Iqbal in Urdu, it was published in 1936, two years before his death. In which he described as his political manifesto. It was published with the subtitle "A Declaration of War Against the Present Times. Muhammad Iqbal argues that modern problems are due to the godlessness, materialism, and injustice of modern civilisation, which feeds on the subjugation and exploitation of weak nations, especially the Indian Muslims.

Iqbal's final work was Armughan-e-Hijaz  (The Gift of Hijaz), published posthumously in 1938. The first part contains quatrains in Persian, and the second part contains some poems and epigrams in Urdu. The Persian quatrains convey the impression that the poet is travelling through the Hijaz in his imagination. The profundity of ideas and intensity of passion are the salient features of these short poems.

Iqbal's vision of mystical experience is clear in one of his Urdu ghazals, which was written in London during his student days. Some verses of that ghazal are:

English 
Iqbal wrote two books, The Development of Metaphysics in Persia (1908) and The Reconstruction of Religious Thought in Islam (1930), and many letters in the English language. He also wrote a book on Economics that is now rare. In these, he revealed his thoughts regarding Persian ideology and Islamic Sufism – in particular, his beliefs that Islamic Sufism activates the searching soul to a superior perception of life. He also discussed philosophy, God and the meaning of prayer, human spirit and Muslim culture, as well as other political, social and religious problems.

Iqbal was invited to Cambridge to participate in a conference in 1931, where he expressed his views, including those on the separation of church and state, to students and other participants:

Punjabi 
Iqbal also wrote some poems in Punjabi, such as "Piyaara Jedi" and "Baba Bakri Wala", which he penned in 1929 on the occasion of his son Javed's birthday. A collection of his Punjabi poetry was put on display at the Iqbal Manzil in Sialkot. 

Iqbal was deeply influenced by Punjabi Sufis. Once a comrade recited a poem by Bulleh Shah and he was "so much touched and overwhelmed...that tears rolled down his cheeks."

Modern reputation

"Poet of the East" 

Iqbal has been referred to as the "Poet of the East" by academics, institutions and the media.

The Vice-Chancellor of Quaid-e-Azam University, Dr. Masoom Yasinzai, stated in a seminar addressing a distinguished gathering of educators and intellectuals that Iqbal is not only a poet of the East but is a universal poet. Moreover, Iqbal is not restricted to any specific segment of the world community, but he is for all humanity.

Iqbal's revolutionary works through his poetry affected the Muslims of the subcontinent. Iqbal thought that Muslims had long been suppressed by the colonial enlargement and growth of the West. For this concept, Iqbal is recognised as the "Poet of the East".

The Urdu world is very familiar with Iqbal as the "Poet of the East". Iqbal is also called Muffakir-e-Pakistan ("The Thinker of Pakistan") and Hakeem-ul-Ummat ("The Sage of the Ummah"). The Pakistan government officially named him Pakistan's "national poet".

Iran 
In Iran, Iqbal is known as Iqbāl-e Lāhorī (Iqbal of Lahore). Iqbal's Asrare-i-Khudi and Bal-i-Jibreel are particularly popular in Iran. At the same time, many scholars in Iran have recognised the importance of Iqbal's poetry in inspiring and sustaining the Iranian Revolution of 1979. During the early phases of the revolutionary movement, it was common to see people gathering in a park or corner to listen to someone reciting Iqbal's Persian poetry, which is why people of all ages in Iran today are familiar with at least some of his poetry, notably Zabur-i-Ajam.

Ayatollah Ali Khamenei has stated, "We have a large number of non-Persian-speaking poets in the history of our literature, but I cannot point out any of them whose poetry possesses the qualities of Iqbal's Persian poetry. Iqbal was not acquainted with Persian idiom, as he spoke Urdu at home and talked to his friends in Urdu or English. He did not know the rules of Persian prose writing. [...] In spite of not having tasted the Persian way of life, never living in the cradle of Persian culture, and never having any direct association with it, he cast with great mastery the most delicate, the most subtle and radically new philosophical themes into the mould of Persian poetry, some of which are unsurpassable yet."

By the early 1950s, Iqbal became known among the intelligentsia of Iran. Iranian poet laureate Muhammad Taqi Bahar universalised Iqbal in Iran. He highly praised the work of Iqbal in Persian.

In 1952, Iranian Prime Minister Mohammad Mossadeq, a national hero because of his oil nationalisation policy, broadcast a special radio message on Iqbal Day and praised his role in the struggle of the Indian Muslims against British imperialism. At the end of the 1950s, Iranians published the complete Persian works. In the 1960s, Iqbal's thesis on Persian philosophy was translated from English to Persian. Ali Shariati, a Sorbonne-educated sociologist, supported Iqbal as his role model as Iqbal had Rumi. An example of the admiration and appreciation of Iran for Iqbal is that he received the place of honour in the pantheon of the Persian elegy writers.

Iqbal became even more popular in Iran in the 1970s. His verses appeared on banners, and his poetry was recited at meetings of intellectuals. Iqbal inspired many intellectuals, including Ali Shariati, Mehdi Bazargan and Abdulkarim Soroush. His book The Reconstruction of Religious Thought in Islam was translated by Mohammad Masud Noruzi.

Key Iranian thinkers and leaders who were influenced by Iqbal's poetry during the rise of the Iranian revolution include Khamenei, Shariati and Soroush, although much of the revolutionary guard was familiar with Iqbal's poetry. At the inauguration of the First Iqbal Summit in Tehran (1986), Khamenei stated that in its "conviction that the Quran and Islam are to be made the basis of all revolutions and movements", Iran was "exactly following the path that was shown to us by Iqbal". Shariati, who has been described as a core ideologue for the Iranian Revolution, described Iqbal as a figure who brought a message of "rejuvenation", "awakening" and "power" to the Muslim world.

The West 

Iqbal's views on the Western world have been applauded by Westerners, including United States Supreme Court Associate Justice William O. Douglas, who said that Iqbal's beliefs had "universal appeal". Soviet biographer N. P. Anikoy wrote:

Others, including Wilfred Cantwell Smith, stated that with Iqbal's anti-capitalist holdings, he was "anti-intellect", because "capitalism fosters intellect". Freeland Abbott objected to Iqbal's views of the West, saying that they were based on the role of imperialism and that Iqbal was not immersed enough in Western culture to learn about the various benefits of the modern democracies, economic practices and science. Critics of Abbot's viewpoint note that Iqbal was raised and educated in the European way of life, and spent enough time there to grasp the general concepts of Western civilisation.

Legacy 

Iqbal is widely commemorated in Pakistan, where he is regarded as the ideological founder of the state. Iqbal is the namesake of many public institutions, including the Allama Iqbal Campus Punjab University in Lahore, the Allama Iqbal Medical College in Lahore, Iqbal Stadium in Faisalabad, Allama Iqbal Open University in Pakistan, Iqbal Memorial Institute in Srinagar, Allama Iqbal Library in the University of Kashmir, the Allama Iqbal International Airport in Lahore, Iqbal Hostel in Government College University, Lahore, the Allama Iqbal Hall at Nishtar Medical College in Multan, Gulshan-e-Iqbal Town in Karachi, Allama Iqbal Town in Lahore, Allama Iqbal Hall at Aligarh Muslim University, Allama Iqbal Hostel at Jamia Millia Islamia in New Delhi and Iqbal Hall at the University of Engineering and Technology, Lahore.

In India, his song "Tarana-e-Hind" is frequently played as a patriotic song speaking of communal harmony. Dr. Mohammad Iqbal, an Indian documentary film directed by K.A. Abbas and written by Ali Sardar Jafri was released in 1978. It was produced by Government of India's Films Division.

The Government of Madhya Pradesh in India awards the Iqbal Samman, named in honor of the poet, every year at the Bharat Bhavan to Indian writers for their contributions to Urdu literature and poetry.

The Pakistani government and public organisations have sponsored the establishment of educational institutions, colleges, and schools dedicated to Iqbal and have established the Iqbal Academy Pakistan to research, teach and preserve his works, literature and philosophy. The Allama Iqbal Stamps Society was established for the promotion of Iqbal in philately and in other hobbies. His son Javed Iqbal served as a justice of the Supreme Court of Pakistan. Javaid Manzil was Iqbal's last residence. Iqbal Academy Lahore has published magazines on Iqbal in Persian, English and Urdu.

Gallery

Bibliography 

Prose book in Urdu
 Ilm ul Iqtisad (1903)

Prose books in English
 The Development of Metaphysics in Persia (1908)
 The Reconstruction of Religious Thought in Islam (1930)

Poetic books in Persian
 Asrar-i-Khudi (1915)
 Rumuz-i-Bekhudi (1917)
 Payam-i-Mashriq (1923)
 Zabur-i-Ajam (1927)
 Javid Nama (1932)
 Pas Cheh Bayed Kard ai Aqwam-e-Sharq (1936)
 Armughan-e-Hijaz (1938) (in Persian and Urdu)

Poetic books in Urdu
 Bang-i-Dara (1924)
 Bal-i-Jibril (1935)
 Zarb-i Kalim (1936)

See also 
 Index of Muhammad Iqbal–related articles

References

Further reading 
 
 
 
 
 
 
 
 

Burzine Waghmar, Annemarie Schimmel: Iqbal and Indo-Muslim Studies, Encyclopædia Iranica, New York: Encyclopædia Iranica Foundation, published online, 16 April 2018.
Md Mahmudul Hasan, "Iqbal’s and Hassan’s Complaints: A Study of “To the Holy Prophet” and “SMS to Sir Muhammad Iqbal”." The Muslim World 110.2 (2020): 195–216. Iqbal’s and Hassan’s Complaints: A Study of “To the Holy Prophet” and “SMS to Sir Muhammad Iqbal”

Online 
 Muhammad Iqbal: poet and philosopher, in Encyclopædia Britannica Online, by Sheila D. McDonough, The Editors of Encyclopædia Britannica, Aakanksha Gaur, Gloria Lotha, J.E. Luebering, Kenneth Pletcher and Grace Young

External links 

 The collection of Urdu poems: Columbia University
 
 
 E-Books of Allama Iqbal on Rekhta 

1877 births
1938 deaths
Indian Muslims
 
Leaders of the Pakistan Movement
Urdu-language poets
Indian male poets
Knights Bachelor
Indian Knights Bachelor
20th-century Muslim scholars of Islam
Government College University, Lahore alumni
Heidelberg University alumni
Persian-language poets
Persian-language writers
Islamic philosophers
20th-century Indian philosophers
Kashmiri people
Punjabi people
Alumni of Trinity College, Cambridge
Alumni of the Inns of Court School of Law
Members of Lincoln's Inn
Muhammad
People from Sialkot
Writers from Lahore
Urdu-language theologians
Urdu-language children's writers
Urdu-language letter writers
Urdu-language writers from British India
Urdu-language religious writers
20th-century Urdu-language writers
Pakistan Movement
National symbols of Pakistan
Academic staff of the Government College University, Lahore
Oriental College alumni
Murray College alumni
20th-century Indian poets
Indian Arabic-language poets
Islam in India
Founders of Indian schools and colleges